Aman Central Mall is a shopping mall in Alor Setar, Kedah, Malaysia. It is located at the intersection of Jalan Tambang Badak, Jalan Mahdali and Jalan Teluk Wanjah, along Lebuhraya Darulaman opposite Alor Setar Tower. The location of Aman Central Mall was previously an abandoned site for more than 30 years which was initially proposed for Plaza Tunku Yaakob. In year 2011, the then state government led by MB Dato' Seri Azizan Abdul Razak  invited Belleview Sdn Bhd to revive the site.

About 
The mall has shops, a 10-screen cinema owned by Golden Screen Cinemas, 30-lane bowling alley, eateries and services.

See also
 List of shopping malls in Malaysia

References

External links
Official web site

Alor Setar
Shopping malls established in 2015
Shopping malls in Kedah
Malaysian companies established in 2015